Setanta GAA or Setanta Hurling Club may refer to:

 Setanta Berlin GAA, a sports club in Germany
 Setanta Hurling Club (Donegal), a sports club in Killygordon, Ireland
 Setanta Hurling Club (Dublin), a sports club in Ballymun, Ireland

See also
 Setanta Sports#Programming, television channel that aired GAA coverage
 Setanta Sports 1#Gaelic Athletic Association, television channel that aired GAA coverage
 Setanta (disambiguation)